Donald F. Sangster is a Canadian economic geologist. He has worked for the Geological Survey of Canada.

Sangster was president of the Society of Economic Geologists in 1994.

Awards
1984, The Society of Economic Geologists Silver Medal
1998, awarded the Logan Medal by the Geological Association of Canada

Selected publications
 Sangster, D.F., 1968, Some chemical features of lead-zinc deposits in carbonate rocks: Canada Geological Survey Paper 68–39, 17 p.
 Sangster, D.and Leach, D.L., 1995, Evidence for a genetic link between SEDEX and MVT deposits, in Leach, D.L. and Goldhaber, M.B., eds., Extended Abstracts, International Field Conference on Carbonate-hosted Lead-Zinc deposits, St. Louis Missouri, June 1–4, p. 260-263
 Donald F. Sangster (2002): The role of dense brines in the formation of vent-distal sedimentary- exhalative (SEDEX) lead-zinc deposits: field and laboratory evidence. Mineralium Deposita  37: 149-157

References

Geological Association of Canada Medals and Awards

Canadian geologists
Geological Survey of Canada personnel
Year of birth missing (living people)
Living people
Economic geologists
Logan Medal recipients